Elektroprivreda Srbije (abbr. EPS; full legal name: Javno preduzeće Elektroprivreda Srbije Beograd) is a state-owned electric utility power company with headquarters in Belgrade, Serbia. It was founded in 1991 and it has 28,083 employees (as of 2019), making it the largest enterprise in the country.

The company has an installed capacity of 7,326 MW and generates 36.461 TWh of electricity per year. Its installed capacity in lignite-fired thermal power plant is 4,390 MW, gas-fired and liquid fuel-fired combined heat and power plants is 336 MW, and hydro power plants is 2,936 MW. EPS also operates three power plants of total capacity 461 MW which are not in the ownership of the company.

EPS is also the largest producer of lignite in Serbia operating in the Kolubara and Kostolac basins, producing around 37 million tonnes per year.

History

Since 1870, the coal production has begun in Serbia. Fourteen years later, the first electric lighting in Serbia was furnished in the military office building in Kragujevac. On October 6, 1893, the first Serbian power plant in Belgrade started with the production of electricity.

In 1900, the first alternating current hydroelectric power plant Pod gradom in Užice on the river Đetinja went online. This power plant is still operating. In 1909, hydroelectric plants Gamzigrad in Zaječar and Sveta Petka in Niš began to build. Two years later, the hydroelectric power station on the river Moravica in Ivanjica was put in the operation.

In Belgrade, the power plant Snaga i Svetlost was built in 1933, being one of the largest in the Balkans at that time.

1945–1991
The establishment of the Električno preduzeće Srbije followed in 1945. Between 1947 and 1950, the hydroelectric power plant Sokolovica and coal power plants Mali Kostolac and Veliki Kostolac, the first power stations to be built in Serbia after the Second World War. In 1952, the underground mining of the coal field Kolubara had started. Four years later, coal power plant RB Kolubara went in operation. A year earlier, the hydroelectric power plants Vlasina and Zvornik have been connected to the power grid. In the period from 1960 to 1967, hydroelectric power plants Bistrica, Kokin Brod and Potpeć were under construction.

In 1965, Združeno elektroprivredno preduzeće Srbije was founded. The coal-fired power plant Bajina Bašta began with the production of electricity a year later. The two largest power plants in Serbia, the hydroelectric power plant HPP Đerdap I at the Danube river and the coal power plant TENT, went into operation in 1970. Twelve years later, the pumped storage plant Bajina Bašta was built, and in 1990 the hydroelectric power station Pirot was put into operation.

1991–2004
In 1991, the company was reorganized and changed name to Elektroprivreda Srbije.

During the NATO bombing of Yugoslavia in 1999, many power plants have been severely damaged. With the establishment of the UNMIK administration in Kosovo on July 1, 1999, the company lost its access to the local coal mines and power plants, including Kosovo A and Kosovo B power plants.

Since then, government-owned Elektroprivreda Srbija by political decision continued to pay off earnings to all of Kosovo-based EPS companies - EPS Surface Mining Kosovo, EPS TPP Kosovo and EPS Elektrokosmet. However, all these employees are not working in Kosovo-based power plants, and are only occasionally and indirectly employed by EPS throughout the rest of Serbia. As of May 2009, there was a total of around 7,000 such employees which were working only on paper and receive regular earnings. As of June 2017, that number was cut to 4,539 employees.

2004–2013
Following the stabilization of the country after war, in 2004 EPS was again a member of the European interconnected system UCTE. Company operates in the current form since July 1, 2005. Then, the electric power transmission division of EPS was split from the company and established as its own public enterprise, named Elektromreža Srbije (EMS).

Since 2007, EPS has prepared plans for the construction of new power plants and the expansion of existing plants to increase generating capacity and meet growing consumption demand.

2013–present
EPS de facto holds a monopoly on the electricity market in Serbia. Since 1 January 2013, the Serbian electricity market has been open to other companies with the expectations to be completely liberalized in the coming years. Since then, EPS has continued with further reorganization for better company's effectiveness. In 2014, EPS was split into two subsidiaries - EPS Distribucija Belgrade and EPS Trgovanje Ljubljana.

Market and financial data
In 2011, company's total assets and the equity increased for nearly 100 percent.

According to the consolidated annual report in 2012, total assets of this company dropped from €12.049 billion to €9.446 billion, and the total company's equity dropped from €8.909 billion to €6.867 billion, with the negative net income of 108.51 million euros. In 2013, the company managed to become profitable for the second time since 2007, with annual net profit of €167.23 million. From 2013 to 2016, EPS has continued trend of posting positive annual net results. After years of posting positive net results, Elektroprivreda Srbije had negative net income of 11 million euros for 2018 calendar year.

Subsidiaries
 EPS Distribucija Belgrade
 EPS Trgovanje Ljubljana

Major power plants
 TPP "Nikola Tesla A" (Obrenovac)
 TPP "Nikola Tesla B" (Obrenovac)
 HPP "Đerdap I" (Kladovo)
 HPP "Đerdap II" (Kladovo)
 TPP "Kostolac" (Kostolac)
 HE "Bajina Bašta" (Bajina Bašta)

Allegations of corruption
In 2011 EPS was under the investigation by the police and the national anti-corruption body. Allegations were related to RB Kolubara (EPS's subsidiary) management which was found to be implicated in a number of different schemes involving equipment procurement and leasing and the sale of coal. In October 2011 authorities arrested 17 people, including two former directors of the Kolubara mine Dragan Tomic and Vladan Jovicic, eight executive managers and seven owners of private firms with which Kolubara conducted business. In April 2014 the Organized Crime Prosecutor has issued an official order for the police to look into the allegations about possible wrongdoings at the EPS. The allegations were based on the report of the Anti-Corruption Council which showed discrepancies in the quantities of electricity imported and exported by EPS from 2010 to 2012.

See also
 Energy in Serbia
 List of power stations in Serbia
 Electricity distribution companies by country

References

External links

 

 
Companies based in Belgrade
Electric power companies of Serbia
Energy companies established in 2005
Energy companies of Serbia
Government-owned companies of Serbia
Non-renewable resource companies established in 2005
Serbian companies established in 2005
Government-owned energy companies